I Love You Karlsson (Swedish: Jag älskar dig, Karlsson!) is a 1947 Swedish comedy film directed by Lau Lauritzen and John Zacharias and starring Marguerite Viby, Sture Lagerwall and Olof Winnerstrand. It was shot at the ASA Film Studios at Lyngby in Copenhagen and on location in Stockholm. It was a remake of the 1946 Danish film I Love Another.

Synopsis
Marie enjoys working at her nursery but is shocked to discover that the owner of its site has sold the house and the new owner wishes to close the school. She sets out to change the mind of Connie, who just inherited the property, and discovers help from an unexpected direction.

Cast
 Marguerite Viby as 	Marie Hagberg
 Sture Lagerwall as 	John Sylvander
 Olof Winnerstrand as 	Kalle
 Ib Schønberg as 	Johansen 
 Lillebil Kjellén as 	Connie Schmidt
 Viveca Serlachius as 	Elsa
 Curt Masreliez as Torsten
 Astrid Bodin as Karin
 Linnéa Hillberg as 	Daghemsföreståndarinnan 
 Solveig Lagström as 	Tora 
 Jullan Kindahl as 	Hulda
 Lau Lauritzen as 	Karlsson
 Kaj Hjelm as Springpojken 
 Magnus Kesster as Taxichauffören 
 Ingrid Luterkort as 	Kvinna 
 Hanny Schedin as Kvinna 
 Ruth Weijden as 	Connies husjungfru 
 John Zacharias as 	Arkitekten 
 Georg Årlin as 	Karlsson senior

References

Bibliography 
 Krawc, Alfred. International Directory of Cinematographers, Set- and Costume Designers in Film: Denmark, Finland, Norway, Sweden (from the beginnings to 1984). Saur, 1986.

External links 
 

1947 films
Swedish comedy films
1947 comedy films
1940s Swedish-language films
Films directed by Lau Lauritzen Jr.
Remakes of Danish films
Films shot in Stockholm
1940s Swedish films